Euphoria is an annual four-day music and camping festival held in Austin, Texas. Euphoria focuses on electronic music but includes hip hop, indie, and jam band artists. The festival also features camping, art installations, live painting, yoga and workshops. The festival debuted in 2012 and was held for the sixth time in the spring of 2017. Over 50,000 attendees gathered at Carson Creek Ranch for Euphoria 2017. The 2018 festival, newly titled Finding Euphoria, took place on May 12.

The 20 acre venue, part of Carson Creek Ranch, sits on the bank of the Colorado River and is approximately five minutes from the Austin-Bergstrom International Airport by car. The 2017 festival site featured three stages: Euphoria, Elements and the Dragonfly Amphitheater. The campgrounds located across Carson Creek hosted over 5,000 campers, plus another exclusive stage and silent disco.

2018 
Finding Euphoria 2018, announced on February 7, 2018, is a one-day festival scheduled for May 12 at Carson Creek Ranch. The May event is part of a new series concept for Euphoria, called the Finding Euphoria Series. The Series includes shows in Austin throughout the year, as well as community events like yoga, group dinner and movie night. With the 2018 announcement, Euphoria also introduced a car camping option to the festival event, which features two nights of camping.

Lineup 
 Gramatik
 Hippie Sabotage
 G Jones
 k?d 
 medasin. 
 Graves
 ATLiens
 +13 more

2017 
Euphoria 2017 showcased a diverse group of artists, ranging from EDM to hip hop. The festival lasted four days and also hosted a variety of activities, workshops, and camping. Euphoria also continued their partnership with Keep Austin Beautiful as a part of their Ecophoria initiative.

Lineup 
 Alesso
 Chromeo
 Pretty Lights Live
 Wiz Khalifa
 Young Thug
 Zeds Dead
 The Disco Biscuits
 The Floozies
 Knife Party
 Moby
 Oliver Heldens
 Post Malone
 Alan Walker
 BadBadNotGood
 Bakermat (live)
 Bob Moses
 Chronixx&Zincfence Redemption
 FKJ
 The Knocks (live)
 Lost Kings
 Mija
 Papadosio
 Russ
 Spag Heddy
 Yotto
 + 51 more

2016 
Euphoria 2016 marked the festival's fifth anniversary and third year at Carson Creek Ranch in Austin, Texas.

Lineup 
 Bassnectar
 Above & Beyond
 Dillon Francis
 STS9
 Eric Prydz
 Juicy J
 GRiZ
 Tycho
 Cherub
 Crizzly
 Klingande
 Lettuce
 Lil Dicky
 LOUDPVCK
 Nahko and Medicine for the People
 Shiba San
 The Motet
 The Polish Ambassador
 Waka Floka Flame
 Autograf
 Branchez
 Break Science
 Jai Wolf
 + 44 more

2015 
Euphoria 2015 remained at Carson Creek Ranch in Austin, Texas. The lineup showcased major names in EDM and drew in approximately 10,000 people per night.

Lineup 
 Pretty Lights
 Ghostland Observatory
 Adventure Club
 Big Gigantic
 RL Grime
 STS9
 Thievery Corporation
 Tritonal
 Emancipator Ensemble
 EOTO
 Paper Diamond
 Thomas Jack
 Yung Lean
 Break Science
 EDX
 Grandtheft
 The New Deal
 Savoy
 + 80 more

2014 
Euphoria 2014 was held on April 25–26 and changed to a new venue, moving to its current home at Carson Creek Ranch in Austin, Texas. For the first time, Euphoria included overnight camping and diversified experiences like yoga sessions and an art gallery. Approximately 4,000 people attended the festival each day.

Lineup 
 Zeds Dead
 Beats Antique
 Gareth Emery
 Lotus
 DVBBS
 Bonobo
 Bro Safari
 Crystal Method
 MAKJ
 BoomBox
 Simon Patterson
 The Floozies
 The Motet
 Keys N Krates
 + 42 more

2013 
In 2013 Euphoria expanded to a two-day festival and the venue changed to The Whitewater Amphitheater in New Braunfels, Texas. The attendance was roughly 3,000 per day.

Lineup 
 Datsik
 Tommy Trash
 EOTO
 Dirtyphonics 
 Baauer
 Felix Cartal
 Clockwork
 Conspirator
 Designer Drugs
 Downlink
 KiloWatts
 Le Castle Vania
 The Polish Ambassador
 Black Matter
 + 15 more

2012 
Euphoria debuted on April 7, 2012 as a one-day event at Thunderhill Raceway in Kyle, Texas. Approximately 2,000 people attended.

Lineup 
 Roger Shah
 Calvertron
 LA Riots
 The White Panda
 Lange
 Glen Morrison
 Darth and Vader
 Big Chocolate
 Shogun
 Yoji
 Rednek
 Archnemesis
 Zoogma
 Rabbit in the Moon
 + 37 more

References

External links 
 Carson Creek Ranch
 White Water Amphitheater

Music festivals in Texas